The Cyrtians or Kyrtians ancient Greek (Κύρτιοι Kýrtioi , Latin Cyrtii) were an ancient tribe in historic Persia near Mount Zagros. Based on their name, it has been suggested that they may be ancestors of the Kurds.
 
According to Rüdiger Schmitt, a tribe dwelling mainly in the mountains of Atropatenian Media (Northern Zagros Mountains) together with the Cadusii, Amardi (or "Mardi"), Tapyri, and others (Strabo 11.13.3). Strabo characterized the Cyrtians living in Persia as migrants and predatory brigands.

In the Hellenistic period, they seem to have been in demand as slingers, for they fought as such for the Median satrap Molon in his revolt against King Antiochus III in 220 BC.

The Cyrtians were not connected to the Carduchi (Cordyaei, Gordyaei, Karduchoi) and the like, who lived farther west. According to Garnik Asatrian, Cyrtians were a collection of indigenous, non-Iranian tribes who only shared a nomadic lifestyle.

References 

Historical Iranian peoples